Rhythmus 21 is a 1921 German absolute film directed by Hans Richter. Rhythmus 21 was made in black and white, and spans for approximately 3 minutes. The film is the first installment of Richter's Film Ist Rhythm series and is considered, by experts, an early and influential film to the abstract film movement. Many absolute films were described as a mixture of art, film, and music because they present on the screen many musical elements such as dynamics, rhythm, and motion. The films in this series get their name from their visual rhythmic element that closely resembles music.

Production
Hans Richter finished his first film Rhythmus 21 (a.k.a. Film ist Rhythmus) in 1921, but kept changing elements until he first presented the work on 7 July 1923 in Paris at the dadaist Soirée du coeur à barbe program in Théâtre Michel. It was an abstract animation of rectangular shapes, partly inspired by his connections with De Stijl. Founder Theo van Doesburg had visited Richter and Eggeling in December 1920 and reported on their film works in his magazine De Stijl in May and July 1921.

References

External links
 
 

Films directed by Hans Richter
1921 films
1921 animated films
1921 directorial debut films
1921 short films
1920s animated short films
1920s avant-garde and experimental films
German silent short films
German black-and-white films
Non-narrative films
Abstract animation
1920s German films